Rebecca Pitcher is an American musical theatre actress. She is primarily known for her role as Christine Daaé in the Broadway adaptation of The Phantom of the Opera.

Biography
Pitcher graduated from Baldwin Wallace College in Ohio and later attending the Peabody Institute. She was part of the Pittsburgh Opera Center at Duquesne, playing roles such as Papagena in The Magic Flute.

From 1999 to 2004, Pitcher played the role of Christine Daaé in the Phantom of the Opera on the third national tour. A year later, she joined the Broadway cast as an alternate for Christine, and on April 17, 2006, she became the main performer of the role, replacing Sandra Joseph.

In February 2018 she joined the cast of Carousel on Broadway.

Performance credits

References

External links
  
 Playbill biography

American musical theatre actresses
Living people
Baldwin Wallace University alumni
1972 births
Peabody Institute alumni
21st-century American women